Nanivitrea helicoides is a species of small freshwater snail that has an operculum, an aquatic gastropod mollusk in the family Hydrobiidae.

Distribution 
Nanivitrea helicoides is endemic to Trinidad, Cuba and has only one known population in Cuba. This species has not been found recently and may no longer exist.

Description 
This small snail has a maximum dimension of less than 3 mm.

References 

Hydrobiidae
Gastropods described in 1865
Endemic fauna of Cuba